The Mayor of Chester is the chief executive of the government of the city of Chester, Pennsylvania as stipulated by the city charter.  This article is a listing of past (and present) mayors of Chester.

On March 5, 1795, the borough of Chester, which had been governed under the charter granted by William Penn in 1701, was incorporated by the Pennsylvania Assembly.  Chester was incorporated as a city on February 4, 1866 with a mayor-council government system, consisting of a popularly elected city mayor and city council. The terms of the mayor and city council members are four years.

Mayors (1866–present)

References
Citations

Sources